Jean Bell (born Annie Lee Morgan on November 23, 1944) is a former Playboy Playmate of the Month, and one of the first African American women to feature in this role. She later had a career as an actress in movies, most prominently in TNT Jackson, in which she played the title character, and supporting roles in Mean Streets and The Klansman, as well as occasional TV appearances.

Biography
Bell grew up in Houston, Texas, along with three younger sisters and attended Texas Southern University, majoring in business administration.  Jean was the first African American woman to participate in the Miss Texas Pageant, which is part of the Miss Universe competition.  She aspired to professional bowling or acting.

When she appeared in the October 1969 issue of Playboy, Bell was only the second African-American woman to be the centerfold (the first being Jennifer Jackson, in March 1965). Her centerfold was photographed by Don Klumpp. A few months later, Bell became the first black person to grace the magazine cover. Darine Stern, who is often erroneously credited with this distinction, was actually the first black woman to appear alone on the cover of Playboy, in the October 1971 issue. Bell was featured with four other playmates on the January 1970 cover.

After Bell's appearance in Playboy, she enjoyed a brief acting career, working on such films as Mean Streets and The Klansman (for some roles she was credited as Jeanne Bell). Her most popular role was the title character in 1975's TNT Jackson.

Bell dated Richard Burton and helped him quit drinking, thus being credited with reuniting him afterwards with Elizabeth Taylor. An Earl Wilson column in September 1975 revealed Bell's three-month friendship with the actor. She visited Burton at his villa in Céligny, Switzerland, during her effort to help him "dry out". With his assistance Bell acquired a place of her own in Geneva, Switzerland. Around that time, Bell worked at Splendors Gentlemen's Club in Houston as "Bunny".

Bell posed nude again for Playboy in the December 1979 pictorial "Playmates Forever!", and subsequently disappeared from public life.

In 1986 she married Gary Judis, then-Chairman of the Board of the California Independent Mortgage Brokers Association, after an eight-year courtship.

Film and television work

Films
 The Choirboys (1977) .... Fanny Forbes
 Casanova & Co. (1977) .... Fatme
 The Muthers (1976) .... Kelly
 Disco 9000 (1976) (as Jeanie Bell) .... Karen
 TNT Jackson (1975) .... Diana "TNT" Jackson
 Policewomen (1974) .... Pam Harris
 The Klansman (1974) .... Mary Anne
 Negro es un bello color (1974) .... Joyce
 Three the Hard Way (1974) .... Polly
 Mean Streets (1973) .... Diane
 Black Gunn (1972) .... Lisa
 Trouble Man (1972) .... Leona
 Melinda (1972) .... Jean

Television
 Starsky and Hutch - "Starsky and Hutch Are Guilty" (1977) .... Kate
 Baretta - "Carla" (1977) .... Midge
 Kolchak: The Night Stalker - "Primal Scream" (1975) .... Rosetta Mason
 That's My Mama - "Clifton's Big Move" (1974) .... Ginger
 Police Woman - "Seven-Eleven" (1974) .... Marie
 Sanford and Son - "Lamont, Is That You?" (1973) .... Judy Ann
 The Beverly Hillbillies
 "Hotel for Women" (1970) .... Sugar Jean Bell
 "Three-Day Reprieve" (1970) .... Sugar Jean Bell
 "Shorty Spits the Hook" (1970) .... Sugar Jean Bell
 "Marry Me, Shorty" (1970) .... Sugar Jean Bell

Trivia
In Quentin Tarantino's Kill Bill movies, Vivica A. Fox's character uses the alias "Jeannie Bell", a reference to Jean Bell.

See also
 List of people in Playboy 1960–1969

References

External links 
 
 

1944 births
Living people
Actresses from St. Louis
American film actresses
1960s Playboy Playmates
African-American Playboy Playmates
African-American female models
African-American actresses
21st-century African-American people
21st-century African-American women
20th-century African-American people
20th-century African-American women